George Kollias may refer to:

George Kollias (biologist) (born 1958), Greek immunologist
George Kollias (drummer) (born 1977), drummer for the American metal band, Nile